Ambatomainty is a district of Melaky in Madagascar.

Communes
The district is further divided into five communes:

 Ambatomainty
 Bemarivo
 Marotsialeha
 Sarodrano
 Makaraingo

References 

Districts of Melaky